Tumeremo Airport  is an airport serving Tumeremo, a town in the Bolívar state of Venezuela.

See also
Transport in Venezuela
List of airports in Venezuela

References

External links
OurAirports - Tumeremo
SkyVector - Tumeremo

Airports in Venezuela